Sizun is a commune in the Finistère department of Brittany in north-western France.

Geography

Climate
Sizun has a oceanic climate (Köppen climate classification Cfb).

Population
Inhabitants of Sizun are called in French Sizuniens.

Breton language
In 2008, 19.74% of primary-school children attended bilingual schools.

See also
Communes of the Finistère department
Parc naturel régional d'Armorique
Sizun Parish close

References

External links

Official website 

Mayors of Finistère Association 

Communes of Finistère